Võ Út Cường (born 12 June 1990) is a Vietnamese footballer who plays as a midfielder for V.League 2 club Khánh Hòa.

References 

1990 births
Living people
Vietnamese footballers
People from Cần Thơ
Association football midfielders
V.League 1 players
Hoang Anh Gia Lai FC players
Can Tho FC players
Khanh Hoa FC players